Stempfferia dorothea is a butterfly in the family Lycaenidae. It is found in Sierra Leone, Liberia, Ivory Coast, Ghana and Togo. The habitat consists of forests.

References

Butterflies described in 1904
Poritiinae